Rana Inder Pratap Singh is an Indian politician from Punjab. He was elected to the 16th Punjab Assembly in the 2022 Punjab Legislative Assembly election.

MLA
He was elected in 2022. The Aam Aadmi Party gained a strong 79% majority in the sixteenth Punjab Legislative Assembly by winning 92 out of 117 seats in the 2022 Punjab Legislative Assembly election. MP Bhagwant Mann was sworn in as Chief Minister on 16 March 2022.

Personal life 
His father Rana Gurjeet Singh is a former minister.

References 

20th-century births
Living people
Punjab, India MLAs 2022–2027
Independent politicians in India